The Garrick Theatre is a West End theatre, located in Charing Cross Road, in the City of Westminster, named after the stage actor David Garrick. It opened in 1889 with The Profligate, a play by Arthur Wing Pinero, and another Pinero play, The Notorious Mrs. Ebbsmith, was an early success at the theatre. In its early years, the Garrick appears to have specialised in the performance of melodrama. The theatre later became associated with comedies, including No Sex Please, We're British, which played for four years from 1982 to 1986.

History 
There was previously another theatre that was sometimes called the Garrick in London, in Leman Street, opened in 1831 and demolished in 1881.

The new Garrick Theatre was financed in 1889 by the playwright W. S. Gilbert, the author of over 75 plays, including the Gilbert and Sullivan comic operas. It was designed by Walter Emden, with C. J. Phipps brought in as a consultant to help with the planning on the difficult site after an underground river was discovered in the excavation. Originally the theatre had 800 seats on four levels, but the gallery (top) level has since been closed and the seating capacity reduced to 656.

The theatre's first manager was Gilbert's friend John Hare. The first play at the theatre, The Profligate, by Arthur Wing Pinero and starring Hare, opened on 24 April 1889. Sydney Grundy's long-running French-style comedy A Pair of Spectacles opened here in February 1890. Mrs Patrick Campbell starred five years later in Pinero's The Notorious Mrs. Ebbsmith. Afterwards, the theatre suffered a short period of decline until it was leased by Arthur Bourchier for six years, whose wife, Violet Vanbrugh, starred in a series of successful productions ranging from farce to Shakespeare.

In 1900, the theatre hosted J. M. Barrie's The Wedding Guest. Rutland Barrington presented several stage works at the Garrick, including his popular "fairy play" called Water Babies in 1902, based on Charles Kingsley's book, with music by Alfred Cellier, among others. The only piece actually premiered by W. S. Gilbert here was Harlequin and the Fairy's Dilemma (retitled The Fairy's Dilemma after a few days), a "Domestic Pantomime" (1904). In 1921, Basil Rathbone played Dr. Lawson in The Edge o' Beyond at the Garrick, and the following year Sir Seymour Hicks appeared in his own play, The Man in Dress Clothes. In 1925, Henry Daniell played there as Jack Race in Cobra and appeared there again as Paul Cortot in Marriage by Purchase in March 1932.

A proposed redevelopment of Covent Garden by the GLC in 1968 saw the theatre under threat, together with the nearby Vaudeville, Adelphi, Lyceum, and Duchess Theatres. An active campaign by Equity, the Musicians' Union, and theatre owners under the auspices of the Save London Theatres Campaign led to the abandonment of the scheme. The gold-leaf auditorium was restored in 1986 by the stage designer Carl Toms, and in 1997 the front façade was renovated.

The theatre has mostly been associated with comedies or comedy-dramas. More recent productions are listed below and include No Sex Please, We're British (1982), which played for four years at the theatre before transferring to the Duchess Theatre in 1986. In 1995, the Royal National Theatre's multi-award-winning production of J. B. Priestley's An Inspector Calls opened here, having played successful seasons at the Royal National Theatre's Lyttelton and Olivier theatres as well as the Aldwych Theatre and a season on Broadway.

In 1986, the Garrick was acquired by the Stoll Moss Group, and in 2000 it became a Really Useful Theatre when Andrew Lloyd Webber's Really Useful Group and Bridgepoint Capital purchased Stoll Moss Theatres Ltd. In October 2005, Nica Burns and Max Weitzenhoffer purchased the Garrick Theatre, and it became one of five playhouses operating under their company name of Nimax Theatres Ltd, alongside the Lyric Theatre, Apollo Theatre, Vaudeville Theatre and Duchess Theatre.

The interior retains many of its original features, and was Grade II* listed by English Heritage in September 1960.

Notable productions 
 1890 – A Pair of Spectacles by Sydney Grundy
 1895 – The Notorious Mrs. Ebbsmith, starring Mrs Patrick Campbell
 1902 – Water Babies, an adaptation by Rutland Barrington of Charles Kingsley's novel, with music by Alfred Cellier and others.
 1924 – The Rat, written by and starring Ivor Novello
 1947 – Laurence Olivier directed Jack Buchanan in Born Yesterday
 1955 – La Plume de Ma Tante ran to 1957
 1960 – Lionel Bart's Fings Ain't Wot They Used T'Be began a two-year run with Miriam Karlin
 1967 – Brian Rix presented and appeared in Stand By Your Bedouin, the first in several seasons of farces, including Uproar in the House and Let Sleeping Wives Lie
 1971 – The last of these farces was Don't Just Lie There, Say Something!
 1972 – Anthony Shaffer's Sleuth transferred
 1977 – Side By Side By Sondheim transferred and was a continuing success
 1978 – Ira Levin's thriller Deathtrap ran until 1981

 1982 – No Sex Please, We're British transferred from the Strand Theatre and remained until 1986
 1995 – An Inspector Calls played its second prolonged West End season
 2002 – This Is Our Youth played two seasons
 2009 – A Little Night Music played until 2011
 2011 – Chicago transferred from the Cambridge Theatre; closed in 2012 after 15 years in the West End
 2013 – Rock of Ages transferred from the Shaftesbury Theatre for its last year in the West End
 2014 – Let It Be transferred from the Savoy Theatre; played briefly in 2014 and through most of 2015
 2017 – Mel Brooks' Young Frankenstein, directed and choreographed by Susan Stroman starring Hadley Fraser, Ross Noble, Lesley Joseph, Summer Strallen, Shuler Hensley, Cory English
 2019 – Bitter Wheat, written and directed by David Mamet, starring John Malkovich.
2020 – Death Drop, starring Courtney Act and Monét X Change. After closing due to COVID-19 the show reopened in May 2021 starring Willam Belli and Latrice Royale.
 2021 – The Drifters Girl, musical starring Beverley Knight as The Drifters manager Faye Treadwell.
 2022 – My Son's a Queer (But What Can You Do?) written and performed by Rob Madge
 2022 – Orlando by Virginia Woolf, adapted by Neil Bartlett, directed by Michael Grandage starring Emma Corrin
 2023 – Bonnie & Clyde by Frank Wildhorn, Don Black and Ivan Menchell

Notes

References

External links 

 
 Article on Garrick Theatre
 Information about the Garrick and other Victorian theatres

West End theatres
Theatres in the City of Westminster
Grade II* listed buildings in the City of Westminster
Theatres completed in 1889
Charles J. Phipps buildings
Charing Cross Road